The surname McDonagh, also spelled MacDonagh is from the Irish language Mac Dhonnchadha, and is now one of the rarer surnames of Ireland.

Mac Dhonnchadha, Mac Donnchadha,  Mac Donnacha or Mac Donnchaidh is the original form of McDonagh

These surnames are found in their greatest numbers in Connacht (Connaught), especially the counties  of Sligo, Roscommon and Galway.

Dhonnchadha, literally translated from the Irish language, means "brown warrior". The prefix mac  means "son of". The MacDonaghs are renowned actors, playwrights, and revolutionaries, including the likes of Hugh MacDonagh (Actor - Evelyn), Martin McDonagh (Playwright) and Thomas McDonagh (a leader of the 1916 Easter Rising).

Naming conventions

Early history

Tomaltach na Cairge mac Diarmata (Tomaltach of the rock) was the King of Moylurg from 1197 until his death in 1207. One of Tomaltach's sons, Donnchadh, was the progenitor of the MacDonagh sept. The family later became Kings or Lords of the túath of Tír Olliol and Corran now the barony of Tirreril in Co. Sligo.

The first to be known as Mac Donnchadha was Tomaltach Mac Donnchadh, Donnchadh MacDermot's grandson, alive in 1309. Tomaltach Mac Donnchadh and his men fought with Aedh Breifneeh O'Conchobhair (Hugh the Breifnian) defeating in battle Aedh Ó Conchobair, King of Connacht for control of the Three Tuathas.

The Dynastic Wars of Connacht and the Bruce Campaign in Ireland

Following Robert the Bruce's victory at the Battle of Bannockburn over the Kingdom of England in 1314, his brother, Edward Bruce, led a three-year military campaign in Ireland against the English controlled Lordship of Ireland (Norman Ireland) beginning in 1315. A large scale dynastic war broke out in Connacht as a result of this intervention into Ireland as Fedlim saw opportunity in the chaos. This proved to be just as momentous on a national level. In 1316, Tomaltach Mac Donnchadha and his clan joined Maelruanaidh mac Diarmata, Domhnall Ó Conchobair, Fedlim Ó Conchobair and an assortment of Norman-Irish families and defeated the army of Ruaidri Ó Conchobair, Diarmait Gall Mac Diarmata (King of Moylurg) at the Battle of Tochar Mona Conneda. Fedlim became king of Connacht. He installed Ualgharg Ua Ruairc as King of Breifne and started a campaign to “to banish the [Norman colonists] of West Connacht". This resulted in the killings of Stephen de Exeter, his brother Philip, Miles de Cogan, Lord de Prendergast, William Lawless, Nicholas de Staunton, William and Phillip Barrett, Maurice de Rochefort and many more. With one stroke, vast swathes of the principal Anglo-Irish of Connacht were gone. With another, Fedlim installed Donnchad Ó Brian as kingship of Tuadmuma, uniting the Dal gCais under him. The Lordship of Ireland, under William Liath de Burgh (de Burke), assembled a large Anglo-Norman army and defeated Fedlim Ó Conchobair at the Second Battle of Athenry. Five of the Clann Donnchadha fell there; Tomaltach son of Gilla Crist Mac Donnchadha, Murchad Mac Donnchadha, Conchobar son of Tadc, Muirchertach and Maelsechlainn Mac Donnchadha. Eoin Mac Aedacain, brehon to Ó Conchobair, Gilla na Naem son of Dail re Docair Ó Dobailein, the standardbearer, and Tomas Ó Conallain fell around their lord.

In 1318, Maelruanaid mac Diarmata assembles a large army, against Cathal O Conchobair. The chief men in it being Toirrdelbach O Conchobair, king of Connacht, Ualgharg Ua Ruairc, king of Brefne, Conchobar O Cellaig, king of Ui Maine and Tomaltach Mac Donnchadha, Lord of Tirerrill. Skirmishes are fought and in 1320, Tomaltach Mac Donnchadha is captured.

By 1381, the clan had settled Ballymote Castle in Sligo. In 1390, Tonnaltagh Mac Donnchadha commissioned the writing of the Book of Ballymote by the family's scribes and ollavs.

The name also arose in Co. Cork where it was located in the Barony of Dunhallow, as a branch of the McCarthys. They were known as the "Lords of Dunhallow" but their stronghold was actually in Kanturk.

Cromwellian Conquest and Jacobite Risings

The clans titles and lands, being Catholics and followers of the Stuarts, were looted under Oliver Cromwell for taking part in the 1641 uprising of Gaelic leaders against the Parliament of London. At this point the family started to scatter and spread from Sligo.

The family was involved with the Jacobite Risings supported the cause king James II who was later defeated by William of Orange in 1691.

Exile to Europe and the Americas

Deprived of their lands, the McDonaghs found scope for their abilities in Europe. Like thousands of their compatriots, they committed themselves to the service of Louis XIV of France, in the Irish Brigade. This period was known in Ireland as the Flight of the Wild Geese and resulted in many members of prominent families and Irish nobility leaving the island. Between 1690 and 1770, no fewer than forty-two McDonaghs served as officers in the Dillion regiment of the Irish Brigade.

The family's presence was widely noted at the decisive French victory at The Battle of Fontenoy. On this day, a charge by six Irish battalions of the French Army turned the favour of the battle against the combined forces of the British, Holy Roman Empire, Dutch Republic and Hanoverian allies. Captain Anthony McDonagh defeated in single-handed combat, in presence of the opposing armies, a British officer who had challenged the best officer his opponents could produce. He later advanced the charge ahead of his company and was the first of the Brigade to engage the enemy, receiving distinctions.

Another acclaimed member of the clan was Colonel Andrew McDonagh, recipient of the Order of Saint Louis. McDonagh along with General Lazare Hoche and Theobald Wolfe Tone, was involved in the Bantry Bay expedition. Under McDonaghs command was 400 men. His life was the subject of writings by Camille Desmoulins and James Rutledge due to his false imprisonment and eventual release during the French Revolution.

Modern diaspora

In modern times, descendants include Thomas McDonagh, Commandant of the 2nd Battalion Dublin Brigade of the Irish Volunteers during the Easter Rising in 1916. Thomas was a signatory of the Proclamation of the Irish Republic and was executed aged 38. Martin McDonagh is an Oscar nominated playwright and film director brought up in London but originally from Sligo and Galway.

Notable people with the surname

Bob McDonagh  (1924–2015), Irish diplomat
Bobby McDonagh (born 1954), Irish diplomat, son of Bob McDonagh
Brendan McDonagh is the Managing Director of the National Asset Management Agency in Ireland.
Charlotte McDonagh (1984 in Edgware, London, England), is a British actress.
Donagh MacDonagh (1912–1968), Irish writer and judge (son of Thomas below).
Eileen MacDonagh (born 1956), Irish sculptor, active from the 1980s.
Enda McDonagh (1930–2021), Irish priest of the Catholic Church.
Francesca McDonagh OBE, is an Irish-British banker. 
Isabella Mercia McDonagh (3 January 1899 – 5 March 1982), also known as Marie Lorraine, was an Australian actress 
Jacko McDonagh (1962, Dublin), was an Irish professional footballer.
Jarlath McDonagh (1945), is a Fine Gael politician from County Galway in Ireland.
Jay McDonagh (born 1973), American football player
Jamie McDonagh (born 8 May 1996) is a Northern Irish professional footballer who plays as a winger or forward for Glentoran.
Jim McDonagh (1952, Rotherham, England), nicknamed Seamus, is currently goalkeeping coach at Aston Villa.
Joe McDonagh (1953–2016), Ballinderreen, County Galway), was the 32nd President of the Gaelic Athletic Association.
Joseph MacDonagh (18 May 1883 – 25 December 1922), was an Irish Sinn Féin politician.
John MacDonagh (1880–1961) was an Irish film director (brother of Thomas MacDonagh)
John Michael McDonagh (1967) is a contemporary English-born Irish screenwriter and film director.
Joseph MacDonagh (died 1922), Irish Sinn Féin politician (brother of Thomas).
Oliver MacDonagh (1924–2002), was a professor of Irish history who made a particular study of the historic relationship between Ireland and the United Kingdom.
Maitland McDonagh, is an American film critic and the author of several books about cinema.
Margaret McDonagh, Baroness McDonagh, is a British Labour Party politician and was General Secretary of the Labour Party from 1998 to 2001 (sister of Siobhain).
Martin McDonagh (1970) is a contemporary English-born Irish playwright and film director.
Bill McDonagh (1928–2019), was a professional Canadian ice hockey player.
Michael MacDonagh, O.P. (1698–1746) was an Irish Roman Catholic prelate who served as the Bishop of Kilmore from 1728 to 1746.
Mike McDonagh is a humanitarian, and a senior United Nations official working for the United Nations Office for the Coordination of Humanitarian Affairs.
Monika MacDonagh-Pajerová (born 1966), Czech academic
Pat McDonagh is the founder of Supermac's
Pat McDonagh (1934–2014), British fashion designer
Paulette McDonagh (11 June 1901 – 30 August 1978), was an Australian film director, who often worked in collaboration with her sisters Phyllis and Isabella. 
Peter McDonagh in Galway, Ireland is a professional boxer.
Philip McDonagh (born 1952) is a poet and former Irish diplomat. 
Phyllis McDonagh (7 January 1900 – 17 October 1978) was an Australian film producer, production designer and journalist.
Ryan McDonagh (1989, Arden Hills, Minnesota) is a professional ice hockey defenceman.
Siobhain McDonagh (1960, London), is a British Labour Member of Parliament for the Mitcham and Morden constituency in London (sister of Margaret).
Stephen McDonagh (1970, Bruree, County Limerick), is a retired Irish sportsperson.
Seamus McDonagh (boxer) is a retired professional boxer who currently works as an actor, screenwriter and filmmaker.
Terence MacDonagh OBE Oboe player. (3 February 1908 – 12 September 1986). Nephew to Thomas MacDonagh below and first cousin to Donagh MacDonagh above. 
Thomas MacDonagh (1878–1916), Irish nationalist poet, playwright, and a leader of the 1916 Easter Rising
Willo McDonagh (1983, Dublin), is an Irish footballer currently playing for Glenavon F.C.

Places

Australia
McDonagh Road, Wyong, NSW.
McDonagh Park, Gunnedah, NSW 
McDonagh Place, Gunnedah, NSW 
McDonagh Place, Lockridge, WA

Canada
McDonagh Road, Lake County, British Columbia

Ireland
Kilruane MacDonagh's GAA club is located in the areas of Kilruane and Cloughjordan, ten miles from Nenagh in north County Tipperary, Ireland. Named for Thomas MacDonagh.
Thomas MacDonagh's GFC is a Gaelic football club in County Tipperary.
Thomas MacDonagh Heritage Museum, Cloughjordan, County Tipperary.
Thomas MacDonagh 1916 Garden of Remembrance, Roscrea, County Tipperary.
MacDonagh Park is a GAA stadium in Nenagh, County Tipperary.
MacDonagh Junction Shopping Centre, Kilkenny, County Kilkenny.
Kilkenny railway station (MacDonagh Station), was given the name MacDonagh on 10 April 1966 in commemoration of Thomas MacDonagh.
Ballymun Flats, Thomas MacDonagh tower (1966–2005) was the second tower to go up in 1966 and in 2005 was demolished by controlled implosion.
McDonagh Street, Nenagh, County Tipperary.

United Kingdom
McDonagh Place, Lawley Bank, Telford

Other
 Blane McDonnagh, the rich kid in the film "Pretty in Pink", portrayed by Andrew McCarthy
 Terence McDonagh, police sergeant in the film "Bad Lieutenant: Port of Call New Orleans", portrayed by Nicolas Cage
 Sgt. Jo McDonagh, army sergeant in the British TV series "Red Cap (TV series)", portrayed by Tamzin Outhwaite
 Joe McDonagh Cup is an annual inter-county hurling competition organised by the Gaelic Athletic Association (GAA). 
 McDonagh Productions was a short-lived Australian production company that produced feature and short films.
 Jordan Devlin is an Irish professional wrestler who performs on WWE's NXT 2.0 brand under the name JD McDonagh.

References

Surnames
Anglicised Irish-language surnames
Irish families
Surnames of Irish origin